Mattie Bogenrief (October 12, 1912 – June 14, 1971) was an American politician who served in the Iowa House of Representatives from the 37th district from 1965 to 1967.

References

1912 births
1971 deaths
Democratic Party members of the Iowa House of Representatives